Sarah Akroun (born February 5, 1994 in Béjaïa) is an Algerian volleyball player.

Club information
Current club :  ASW Bejaia

References
ALG/Algeria - Team Composition at the International Volleyball Federation

1994 births
Volleyball players from Béjaïa
Living people
Algerian women's volleyball players
Setters (volleyball)
21st-century Algerian women